Mont Albert may refer to:
 Mont Albert, Quebec, a mountain in the Gaspé Peninsula, and one of the highest mountains in southern Quebec, Canada
 Mont Albert, Victoria, a suburb of Melbourne, Victoria, Australia

See also
 Mount Albert (disambiguation)